Baron Strang, of Stonesfield in the County of Oxford, was a title in the Peerage of the United Kingdom. It was created on 16 January 1954 for the prominent diplomat Sir William Strang, Permanent Under-Secretary of State for Foreign Affairs from 1949 to 1953. The title passed to his only son, the second Baron, who succeeded in 1978. He was a retired Professor of Philosophy at Newcastle University. There was no heir to the barony, which became extinct on his death in 2014.

Barons Strang (1954)
William Strang, 1st Baron Strang (1893–1978)
Colin Strang, 2nd Baron Strang (1922–2014)

Notes

References
Kidd, Charles, Williamson, David (editors). Debrett's Peerage and Baronetage (1990 edition). New York: St Martin's Press, 1990, 

Extinct baronies in the Peerage of the United Kingdom
Noble titles created in 1954